When the Ticklers Stopped Quivering is the debut studio album by Australian comedian, Austen Tayshus. The album was released in December 1984 and peaked at number 72 on the Australian Kent Music Report.

Track listing

Charts

References

Regular Records albums
1984 albums